Chionodes lictor is a moth in the family Gelechiidae. It is found in North America, where it has been recorded from California, Oregon and British Columbia.

The larvae feed on Pseudotsuga menziesii.

References

Chionodes
Moths described in 1999
Moths of North America